KNIA (1320 kHz "Real Country AM 1320") is a commercial AM radio station licensed to Knoxville, Iowa, United States.  The station airs a classic country radio format and is owned by M and H Broadcasting, Inc.  Programming is also heard on two FM translator stations: 95.3 K237DH in Knoxville and 94.3 K232FR in Indianola.

KNIA includes local news and information in its weekday schedule. On Sundays, Southern Gospel music and other religious programming is aired.  KNIA also broadcasts local high school football and basketball games.

History
Forrest ("Frosty") Mitchell put KNIA on the air in 1960. In September 1964, Mitchell Broadcasting Corporation (Forrest J. Mitchell Jr., president) announced the sale of KNIA to Stevens Radio Corporation.

In December 1992, Leighton Enterprises, Inc., reached an agreement to sell this station to M and H Broadcasting, Inc.  The deal was approved by the FCC on February 23, 1993, and the transaction was consummated on March 1, 1993.

References

External links
KNIA official website

NIA
Country radio stations in the United States
News and talk radio stations in the United States
Radio stations established in 1960
Knoxville, Iowa